Kevin Régimbald-Gagné (born July 7, 1987, in Rouyn-Noranda, Quebec) is a professional Canadian football linebacker who is currently a free agent. He recently played for the Saskatchewan Roughriders of the Canadian Football League. He was drafted in the fifth round, 35th overall by the Roughriders in the 2012 CFL Draft and signed with the team on May 31, 2012. After attending training camp with the Roughriders in 2012, he returned to play CIS football for the Sherbrooke Vert et Or for a fifth year. He re-signed with Saskatchewan on May 17, 2013, and played in his first professional game on August 17, 2013, against the Montreal Alouettes.

References

External links
Saskatchewan Roughriders bio

1987 births
Living people
Players of Canadian football from Quebec
Canadian football linebackers
Sherbrooke Vert et Or football players
Saskatchewan Roughriders players
People from Rouyn-Noranda